Quinta Normal is a commune of Chile located in Santiago Province, Santiago Metropolitan Region. It is named after a large park in the area.

Demographics
The population fell by 10.6% (12337 persons) between the 1992 and 2002 censuses.

Stats
Population: 95,597 (2006 projection)
Average annual household income: US$17,919 (PPP, 2006)
Population below poverty line: 10.8% (2006)
Regional quality of life index: 77.01, mid-high, 19 out of 52 (2005)
Human Development Index: 0.723, 87 out of 341 (2003)

Administration
As a commune, Quinta Normal is a third-level administrative division of Chile administered by a municipal council, headed by an alcalde who is directly elected every four years. The 2012-2016 alcalde is Carmen Gloria Fernández Valenzuela (PDC). The communal council has the following members:
 Karina Delfino Mussa (PS)
 Pablo García Ramírez (PPD)
 Luis Díaz Espinoza (PC)
 Katherine Martorell Awad (RN)
 Javier Lagos Rosales (PDC)
 Francisco Duarte Díaz (PDC)
 Elizabet Rudzajs Corbalán (UDI)
 Lorenzo Mora Moraga (UDI)

Within the electoral divisions of Chile, Quinta Normal is represented in the Chamber of Deputies by Nicolás Monckeberg (RN) and Cristina Girardi (PPD) as part of the 18th electoral district, (together with Cerro Navia and Lo Prado). The commune is represented in the Senate by Guido Girardi Lavín (PPD) and Andrés Allamand (RN) as part of the 7th senatorial constituency (Santiago-West).

References

External links

  — Municipality of Quinta Normal

Populated places in Santiago Province, Chile
Geography of Santiago, Chile
Communes of Chile
Populated places established in 1915
1915 establishments in Chile